Mark O'Toole (born 22 June 1963) is a Roman Catholic Archbishop and is the current Archbishop of Cardiff and Bishop of Menevia.

Early life and education
O'Toole was born in Southwark, England, and attended St Ignatius Primary School, Stamford Hill and St Thomas More Secondary school in Wood Green, leaving in 1981 with four ‘A’ levels before going to the University of Leicester, where he graduated with a B.Sc. in geography in 1984. 

He commenced his studies for the priesthood at Allen Hall Seminary in Chelsea and was ordained a priest on 9 June 1990 by Basil Hume for the Archdiocese of Westminster at the Church of St Ignatius, Stamford Hill, London. 

Between 1990 and 1992 he studied for an M.Phil. in theology at the University of Oxford.

Between 2002 and 2008 he served as the private secretary to Cormac Murphy-O'Connor before his appointment as the rector of Allen Hall Seminary in September 2008.

Episcopal ministry
On 9 November 2013, O'Toole was appointed the ninth bishop of Plymouth by Pope Francis. He received his episcopal consecration on 28 January 2014.   He was the first new bishop of England and Wales appointed by Pope Francis. 

In O'Toole's homily during the Stella Maris Mass for seafarers on 25 September 2014 in Plymouth Cathedral, O'Toole expressed an affinity with the mission of the Apostleship of the Sea, the Catholic charity that provides pastoral and practical support to all seafarers. He said this was because his grandfather was something of a seafarer and fisherman who owned his own boat and made a living in trading goods and supplies off the West coast of Ireland.

On 27 April 2022, Pope Francis appointed O'Toole as Archbishop of Cardiff, succeeding George Stack. At the same time, he also appointed him Bishop of Menevia, thereby merging the two dioceses in persona Episcopi - in the person of the Bishop. His installation took place in Cardiff Cathedral on 20 June 2022, the feast day of Welsh martyrs Saints Julius and Aaron.

References

External links

1963 births
Living people
Roman Catholic clergy from London
21st-century Roman Catholic bishops in England
Roman Catholic bishops of Plymouth
English people of Irish descent
Alumni of the University of Leicester
Roman Catholic bishops of Menevia
Roman Catholic archbishops of Cardiff